Cuspidata is a genus of moths belonging to the subfamily Tortricinae of the family Tortricidae.

Species
Cuspidata anthracitis Diakonoff, 1960
Cuspidata bidens Diakonoff, 1960
Cuspidata castanea Diakonoff, 1960
Cuspidata ditoma Diakonoff, 1960
Cuspidata hypomelas Diakonoff, 1960
Cuspidata leptozona Diakonoff, 1960
Cuspidata micaria Diakonoff, 1973
Cuspidata obscura Diakonoff, 1970
Cuspidata oligosperma Diakonoff, 1960
Cuspidata viettei Diakonoff, 1960

See also
List of Tortricidae genera

References

External links
tortricidae.com

Archipini
Moth genera